Siri Naga II was King of Anuradhapura in the 3rd century, whose reign lasted from 245 to 247. He succeeded his uncle Abhaya Naga as King of Anuradhapura and was succeeded by his son Vijaya Kumara.

See also
 List of Sri Lankan monarchs
 History of Sri Lanka

References

External links
 Kings & Rulers of Sri Lanka
 Codrington's Short History of Ceylon

S
S
S
S